Traktornyi Zavod is a station on Kharkiv Metro's Kholodnohirsko–Zavodska Line. It opened on 11 August 1978. It is named after Tractor plant located near the station.

Kharkiv Metro stations
Railway stations opened in 1978